Praedora tropicalis is a moth of the family Sphingidae. It is known from savanna and bush from Zambia to Uganda and Kenya.

The length of the forewings is 19–24 mm. The body and forewings are very dark grey. The forewings have paler irregular transverse bands and darker transverse crenulate lines. The hindwings are paler, with traces of two faint transverse dark bands. The wings are more rounded than in related Litosphingia.

References

Sphingini
Moths described in 1912